An annular solar eclipse will occur on January 5, 2038. A solar eclipse occurs when the Moon passes between Earth and the Sun, thereby totally or partly obscuring the image of the Sun for a viewer on Earth. An annular solar eclipse occurs when the Moon's apparent diameter is smaller than the Sun's, blocking most of the Sun's light and causing the Sun to look like an annulus (ring). An annular eclipse appears as a partial eclipse over a region of the Earth thousands of kilometres wide.

Images 
Animated path

Related eclipses 

There are 7 eclipses in 2038 (the maximum possible), included four penumbral lunar eclipses: January 21, June 17, July 16, and December 11.

Solar eclipses of 2036–2039

Saros 132

Metonic series

References

External links 
 http://eclipse.gsfc.nasa.gov/SEplot/SEplot2001/SE2038Jan05A.GIF
 Interactive map of the eclipse from NASA

2038 1 5
2038 in science
2038 1 5
2038 1 5